Bissiga may refer to several place in Burkina Faso:

Two places in Bazèga Province

Bissiga, Kombissiri
Bissiga, Saponé

or:
Bissiga, Boulgou
Bissiga, Ganzourgou